The Slingshot Kid is a 1927 American silent Western film directed by Louis King and written by Oliver Drake. The film stars Buzz Barton, Frank Rice, Jean Fenwick, Buck Connors, Jay Morley, and Arnold Gray. The film was released on December 4, 1927, by Film Booking Offices of America.

Cast 
 Buzz Barton as Red Hepner
 Frank Rice as Toby
 Jean Fenwick as Betty
 Buck Connors as Clem Windloss
 Jay Morley as Santa Fe Sullivan
 Arnold Gray as Foreman

References

External links 
 

1927 films
1927 Western (genre) films
Film Booking Offices of America films
Films directed by Louis King
American black-and-white films
Silent American Western (genre) films
1920s English-language films
1920s American films